Edward Adam (b. in Rouen on 11 October 1768, d. in Montpellier on 11 November 1807) was a French chemist who, beginning in 1800 while studying at Montpellier, invented various still modifications to improve chemical rectification, upon which the industrialization of the manufacture of liquor, etc., has since been based.

References

1768 births
1807 deaths
19th-century French inventors
19th-century French chemists
University of Montpellier alumni
Scientists from Rouen
Distillation